José Luis Mamone (born November 25, 1982) is a footballer from Argentina who plays as a defender. He is currently working both as a player and assistant coach for SC Zofingen of the 1. Liga Classic in Switzerland.

Career 
He started his football career in the youth system of San Lorenzo, before moving on to Banfield de Mar del Plata on a free transfer. After one season there he was picked up by FC Luzern.

Honours
Challenge League champions: 2006

References

External links
 José Luis Mamone at BDFA.com.ar 
 football.ch

1982 births
Living people
Sportspeople from Mar del Plata
Argentine footballers
Argentine expatriate footballers
Expatriate footballers in Switzerland
FC Luzern players
FC Wohlen players
Swiss Super League players
San Lorenzo de Almagro footballers
Association football central defenders